Cinemagraphs are still photographs in which a minor and repeated movement occurs, forming a video clip. They are published as an animated GIF or in other video formats, and can give the illusion that the viewer is watching an animation. A variation is a video snapshot (clip composed like a still photo, but instead of a shutter release it is captured using the video recording function with its audio track and perhaps showing minor movement such as the subject's eye blinks). Another variation is an audio snapshot (still photo linked to an audio file created at the moment of photo capture by certain cameras that offer this proprietary function).

Cinemagraphs are made by taking a series of photographs or a video recording, and, using image editing software, compositing the photographs or the video frames into a seamless loop of sequential frames. This is done in such a way that motion in part of the subject between exposures (for example, a person's dangling leg) is perceived as a repeating or continued motion, in contrast with the stillness of the rest of the image.

The term "cinemagraph" was coined by U.S. photographers Kevin Burg and Jamie Beck, who used the technique to animate their fashion and news photographs beginning in early 2011.

History 
The first cinemagraph was recorded in 2011 when two photographers – Kevin Burg and Jamie Beck – put some movement into a photograph of model Coco Rocha for fashion photography for New York Fashion Week. “In the editing process, there’s a moment when it all starts to come together, and it’s magical every time. Even a simple blink is just so cool. It’s like giving life to a marble statue”, they commented.

See also
 Time-lapse photography
 Ken Burns effect
 QuickTime VR
 Worship presentation software often employs cinemagraphs

References

External links

 Cinemagraphs.com, showing the work of Burg and Beck

Photographic techniques
Animation techniques